Sigmoilinita is a miliolid genus (Foraminifera) with an ovate to fusiform test that becomes flattened with growth. Chambers are tubular, one-half coil in length, at first added in a sigmoiline  (S-shaped) series starting at slightly more than 180° apart. the angle gradually decreasing until the later whorls are planispiral. Chambers are numerous, the wall narrow. imperforate, porcelaneous. The aperture at the end of the final chamber. may have a weakly developed tooth

References

 Alfred R. Loeblich Jr and Helen Tappan,1988. Forminiferal Genera and their Classification. E-book 

Tubothalamea
Foraminifera genera
Extant Miocene first appearances